Ilchi ('The Herald') was a Lak language newspaper published in 1917 by the Daghestani Propaganda Bureau. It was edited by G. S. Saidov and A. K. Zakuev.

References

Lak-language newspapers
Newspapers published in Russia
1917 establishments in Russia
1917 disestablishments in Russia
Publications established in 1917
Publications disestablished in 1917
Defunct newspapers published in Russia